Celine Parreñas Shimizu (born December 28, 1969) is a filmmaker and film scholar. She is well known for her work on race, sexuality and representations. She is currently Dean of the Arts Division at the University of California at Santa Cruz.

Background 
Shimizu is the daughter of political refugees from the Philippines. Her family relocated to Boston when she was in her early teens. She attended the University of California at Berkeley and received a B.A. in Ethnic Studies in 1992. She has an M.F.A. in Film Directing and Production from the University of California at Los Angeles and a Ph.D. from Stanford University in Modern Thought and Literature. She is married to Daniel P Shimizu with whom she has two sons. She is a grieving mother whose youngest son Lakas suddenly died in 2013 from a common virus that attacked his heart within 24 hours.

Career 
Shimizu is Dean of the Arts Division at the University of California at Santa Cruz. She was Professor of Cinema Studies and Director of the School of Cinema at San Francisco State University and for fifteen years, was Professor of Film and Performance Studies in the Asian American, Comparative Literature, Feminist, and Film and Media Studies Departments at the University of California at Santa Barbara. She is well known for her work on race, sexuality and representations.

Her sole-authored books include The Proximity of Other Skins: Ethical Intimacy in Global Cinemas (Oxford University Press, 2020), Straitjacket Sexualities: Unbinding Asian American Manhoods in the Movies The book examines transnational films and their representations of intimacy across radical inequality. The book studies scenes of cinematic intimacy in the forging of ethical manhoods on and off screen for Asian American men. Her first book The Hypersexuality of Race: Performing Asian/American Women on Screen and Scene won the Cultural Studies Book Award from the Association for Asian American Studies. In it, she analyzes hypersexual representations of Asian American women in various media including industry and independent film, pornography and feminist video. She edited the book The Feminist Porn Book: The Politics of Producing Pleasure along with Constance Penley, Mireille Miller-Young, and Tristan Taormino.

Shimizu's numerous publications include interviews and articles in the top journals in her fields including Cinema Journal, Concentric, Signs: Journal of Women in Culture and Society, Wide Angle, Theatre Journal, Yale Journal of Law and Feminism, Journal of Asian American Studies and Sexualities. She served as a columnist for the new media journal FLOWTV.org in 2009 and blogger on the They're All So Beautiful web series in 2013.

Her first feature film Birthright: Mothering Across Difference (2009) won the Best Feature Documentary at the Big Mini DV Festival. Her previous filmworks include Mahal Means Love and Expensive (1993), Her Uprooting Plants Her (1995), Super Flip (1997) and The Fact of Asian Women (2002/4), which won four festival awards. Her new film is The Celine Archive (2020), fiscally sponsored by Visual Communications in Los Angeles, is distributed by Women Make Movies and has won several festival awards.

She teaches popular culture, social theories of power and inequality, race and sexuality, feminist and film and performance theory as well as production.

For her scholarship and film work, Dr. Parreñas Shimizu has received many additional awards, fellowships, grants and honors including the Social Science Research Council Sexuality Research Fellowship, the Stanford Asian American Studies Graduate Academic Award, the Edie and Lew Wasserman Directing Fellowship at UCLA, the James Pendleton Foundation Directing Prize at UCLA and the Eisner Prize for Poetry—UC Berkeley's highest award in the creative arts. She has received external faculty fellowships from the United States Studies Centre at the University of Sydney and the Research Institute for Comparative Study in Race and Ethnicity at Stanford University.

While at the University of California at Berkeley, she founded "smell this", the magazine by and about women of color distributed by Third Woman Press and edited "Tea Leaves," the Asian American arts and literary magazine as well as the undergraduate journal "portfolio." At UCLA School of Theatre, Film and Television, she was founding president of the student body.

As a faculty member, Shimizu's service and professional activity includes the leadership of the UCSB Senior Women's Council in 2007–09, and serving on the board of the University of California Committee on Academic Freedom, the UCSB Committee on Faculty Issues and Awards, UCSB Women's Center, the UCSB Interdisciplinary Humanities Center and the UCSB Center for Interdisciplinary Study of Music as well as serving as a jury member for the San Francisco International Asian American Film Festival and the Social Justice Award for Documentary at the Santa Barbara International Film Festival. She convened the inaugural formation of the New Sexualities research focus group at UCSB. And she co-chaired the Asian Pacific Caucus for the Society for Cinema and Media Studies in 2008–10.

On a national level, she has served as a reviewer for the Ford Foundation Diversity Fellowships and the National Endowment for the Humanities' America's Media Makers Program. For Duke University Press, New York University, Oxford University Press, Rutgers University, Temple University, University of Michigan Presses, and journals such as Signs, GLQ, and Frontiers she reviews articles and books.

She has served as Associate Editor for GLQ (Gay and Lesbian Quarterly), Women's International Forum (Elsevier), USA Editor for Asian Diasporas and Visual Cultures of the Americas (Brill) and is currently Associate Editor for GLQ (Duke University Press).

Professor Shimizu advises undergraduate and graduate students in a wide variety of disciplines as well as interdisciplinary areas of inquiry in the U.S. and beyond.

She has served on the Board of Crowded Fire Theater in San Francisco and currently serves on the board of SFFILM.

Publications

Sole-authored books 
 Shimizu, Celine Parreñas (2020). Proximity of other skins: ethical intimacy in global cinema. New York: Oxford University Press. ISBN 9780190865863. 

Winner, 2007 Cultural Studies Book Award, Association for Asian American Studies

Edited books 
 Shimizu, Celine Parreñas; J. Reid Miller; Richard T. Rodriguez (2018). The Unwatchability of whiteness: a new imperative of representation. New York: Brill.

Journal articles 
 Shimizu, Celine Parreñas (Spring/Summer 1998). 
 
 
 
  Pdf.
 
 
  (Formerly published as part of Signs: Journal of Women in Culture and Society.)

Digital humanities 
 “The Vexing Power of Sex and the Face” in Prints of Pop (& War): A Mini-Retrospective of Roger Shimomura. NYU A/P/A Institute. May 2013.
 “Organic Asian American Sexualities” Theyreallsobeautiful.com A web series. April 2013.
 “Straitjacket Sex Screens” A column commissioned by FlowTV.org, University of Texas. September 2009.
 “The Hypersexual Power of the Hip Hop Hottie: The Black Eyed Peas’ ‘Bebot’” A column commissioned by FlowTV.org, University of Texas. July 2009
 “The Making of My Mothering Movie: On Race, Neoliberalism and Mothering” A column commissioned by FlowTV.org, University of Texas, June 2009.

Book chapters

Interviews

Book Reviews 
 
A review of:

Films 
 Producer, Director, Writer, The Celine Archive. (2020) Digital Film. 69 minutes. Premiere: Los Angeles Asian Pacific Film Festival 2020 (online). Theatrical Premiere: Harlem International Film Festival (2021). Awards: Grand Prize for Best Documentary Feature at Culver City Film Festival. Distribution: Women Make Movies.
Producer, Director, Writer and Co-Editor, Birthright: Mothering Across Difference. (2009) Digital Film. 75 minutes. World Premiere: ReelHeart Film Festival. Toronto, Canada. June 2009. Best Feature Documentary, Big Mini DV Film Festival, New York 2009. Distribution: Progressive Films (May 2009).
 Co-Producer, Director, Writer and Editor, The Fact of Asian Women (2002). Digital Film. 26 minutes. Experimental Documentary. The film evaluates the legacy of three generations of Asian American femme fatales in Hollywood. World Premiere: Silver Lake Film Festival, Los Angeles, CA. October 2002. Distribution: Third World Newsreel (Fall 2003)
 Producer, Director, Writer and Editor, Super Flip (1997) 16mm. 30 minutes. An experimental narrative based on interviews with Filipino American low-wage workers in San Francisco regarding work and love. Considered an “underground” classic of Filipino American cinema. World Premiere: Pacific Film Archive, Berkeley Distribution: Progressive Films, Berkeley.
 Producer, Director, Writer and Editor, Her Uprooting Plants Her (1995) An experimental narrative based on interviews with Filipino immigrant families regarding home, memory and exile. World Premiere: Women in the Director's Chair, Chicago. Distribution: New York: Third World Newsreel.
 Producer, Director, Writer and Editor, Mahal Means Love and Expensive (1993). An experimental narrative based on interviews with young Filipina women regarding race, colonialism, sex and love. World Premiere: Women in the Director's Chair, Chicago.

Awards, prizes and distribution 

 For The Hypersexuality of Race: Winner, 2007 Cultural Studies Book Award, Association for Asian American Studies
 For Birthright: Winner, Best Feature Documentary, Big Mini DV Festival, New York, November 2009. Distribution: Progressive Films. 
 For The Fact of Asian Women: Winner, Best Documentary Short, Big Mini DV Film Festival, New York, 2002; Winner, Best Picture, Women's Issues, ZoieFest 2003. Winner in Long Format-Education, DV Awards, 2003. Winner, Best of Festival—Documentary, Berkeley Film and Video Festival 2003; Distribution: Third World Newsreel. (Fall 2004)
 For Super Flip: Motion Picture Association of America Directing Award; Edie and Lew Wasserman Directing Fellowship, 1995–96. World Premiere: Pacific Film Archive, 1996.
 For Her Uprooting Plants Her: Distribution: Third World Newsreel.
 For Mahal Means Love and Expensive: Certificate of Merit, Berkeley Experimental Festival, 1995; Certificate of Merit, Long Island Film Festival, 1995 and Motion Picture Association of America Prize.

Screenings 
Los Angeles Asian American Film Festival, Chicago Asian American Film Festival, Women in the Directors’ Chair International Film Festival in Chicago, Directors’ Guild of America, Arkipelago-NYU Film Festival, New York International Film and Video Festival, Memories of Overdevelopment – U.S., Canada and Latin America, Japanese American Cultural Center in Los Angeles, San Francisco and Los Angeles Filipino Film Festivals, Society for Cinema Studies, Kansas, SF Cinematheque, San Francisco Asian American International Festival, and Plug-In Gallery, Canada, Smithsonian Institution, Los Angeles Asian American Film Festival, Japanese American Cultural Center in Los Angeles, New York, San Francisco and Los Angeles Filipino Film Festivals; Japanese American Cultural Center in Los Angeles, San Francisco and Los Angeles Filipino Film Festivals, Society for Cinema Studies, Kansas, Long Island Festival in New York, San Francisco International Film Festival, Philippine Consulate – New York.

Film collections 
Georgetown University, University of Michigan, University of Massachusetts at Boston; University of Vermont; Temple University, San Francisco State University; Asian CineVision; Visual Communications; Film Arts Foundation; NAATA; University of Hawaii; University of Wisconsin at Madison; Stanford University; Santa Clara University; Northwestern University; Wilfrid Laurier University, Canada; and University of California Berkeley, Davis, Riverside, Los Angeles, and Santa Barbara.

Other publications, radio and TV documentaries 

 Interview with Desiree Gamotin, “Hypersexuality of Asian women, minorities: Despite stereotypes, race-positive sexuality is attainable” February 11, 2009 University of Western Ontario Gazette.
 Interview with Adrienne Clarke . “Professor Discusses Book on Sexuality in Asian Film” in the Daily Targum, Rutgers University. November 12, 2008.
 Interview with Sara Wright, “The Hypersexuality of Asian Women in Film and Other Media: Ridding the Exotification of Asian Women” Mustang Daily, Cal Poly San Luis Obispo. May 8, 2008. Interview with Jori Lewis, “Black Eyed Peas’ Bebot on Public Radio International's The World. January 5, 2007.
 Interview with Poonam Sharma, “Hot or Not” in Audrey Magazine. July 2004.
 Poetry in Nick Carbo and Eileen Tabios, Babaylan: Filipina and Filipina American Literary Anthology. San Francisco: Aunt Lute Press, 2000.
 "Asian American Media Representations” Featured panelist on Forum/ National Public Radio, July 1998.
 Featured Cover Artist in Sau Ling Wong, Critical Mass. Online Journal. UCBerkeley, 1998.
 Featured Filmmaker in Yong Soon Min, Memories of Overdevelopment. Exhibition Catalogue. Irvine, 1997.
 Poetry in Elaine Kim, et al. Making More Waves, Beacon Press, Boston, 1997. 
 Poetry in Walter K. Lew, ed. Premonitions, KAYA Press, New York. 1996.
 Editor-in-chief, smell this: women of color cultural production, Berkeley: Third Woman Press. 1990, 1992.

References

External links
Home page, Celine Shimizu.

Living people
1969 births
University of California, Santa Barbara faculty
University of California, Berkeley alumni
University of California, Los Angeles alumni
Stanford University alumni
American filmmakers
Filipino emigrants to the United States